Wilamówka  is a village in the administrative district of Gmina Trzcianne, within Mońki County, Podlaskie Voivodeship, in north-eastern Poland.

References

Villages in Mońki County

Literatur.

Karl Willamowius: Die Nachkommen eines "Wilhelm", Dülmen 2010, ISBN 978-3-89960-330-9